The Linganore Farm is a historic home and farm complex located at Frederick, Frederick County, Maryland, United States. The main house is a large two-story brick dwelling dating from the 1850s-60s and showing influence of the Greek Revival and Italianate styles.  The property includes the ruins of a brick smokehouse, a stone root cellar and a two-story brick secondary house dating from the early 19th century. Across from the house is the site of the Linganore Mill, which was located on the east bank of the Monocacy River. In front of the house is a terraced lawn defined with large boxwoods. In 1891, the farm was converted to a resort known as the Linganore Hills Inn.

The Linganore Farm was listed on the National Register of Historic Places in 2000.

References

External links
, including photo from 2006, at Maryland Historical Trust

Houses in Frederick County, Maryland
Farms on the National Register of Historic Places in Maryland
Italianate architecture in Maryland
Greek Revival houses in Maryland
National Register of Historic Places in Frederick County, Maryland